K. Francis George is an Indian politician who is a leader of Kerala Congress which is one among several factions of the Kerala Congress. He was a member of the 13th and the 14th Lok Sabha, representing Idukki constituency of Kerala. He was formerly a leader of the Kerala Congress (M) and that of his former party Janadhipathya Kerala Congress.

Political life 
Prior to the 2014 Indian general election, he left Kerala Congress (M) and created a new party —  Janadhipathya Kerala Congress. The party joined the Left Democratic Front (LDF) and he contested in the 2016 Kerala assembly election from Idukki, however he lost the election to the sitting MLA Roshy Augustine. In 2020, he left the Janadhipathya Kerala Congress and rejoined Kerala Congress (M) and he is currently part of the P. J. Joseph faction of the party. In 2021 elections he contested as UDF candidate from idukki. But he lost yet again to Roshy Augustine from KCM in a rematch of sorts with both contestants switching sides from 2016.

Francis George has been on Parliamentary Committees on External Affairs, Defence, Industry, and Commerce.

Personal life 
Francis graduated from Christ College in Bangalore and has been graduated in law by the Law Academy at Trivandrum. He was formerly a banker.

He is the son of K. M. George, the founder of Kerala Congress. Francis George is married to Shiny Chettisseril. They have three children namely K. F. George, K. F. Jose and K. F. Jacob.

References

External links
 Francis George's Virtual Office 

Living people
1955 births
India MPs 2004–2009
Malayali politicians
Syro-Malabar Catholics
People from Idukki district
India MPs 1999–2004
Lok Sabha members from Kerala
Christ University alumni
Kerala Congress (M) politicians